Yağmur Tanrısevsin (born 24 August 1990) is a Turkish actress and designer.

Career 
Tanrısevsin is a graduate of Marmara University School of Fine Arts with a degree in ceramic-glass making. She continues her art career both in the fields of acting and ceramic-glass. She has taken acting classes from the likes of Meltem Cumbul, Betül Alganatay, Ümit Çırak, Bahar Kerimoglu and Merve Taşkan. She made her cinematic debut with the role of Jennifer in the English-language horror movie The Tragedy.

She had guest role in the seriesPis Yedili.In 2011 she played in the seriesAdını Feriha Koydumas Ece. In 2013, she was cast in the movie Aşk Ağlatır. She continued her cinematic career with the film series Geniş Aile: Yapıştır in which she played the role Çağla and "Yok Artık 2" as Damla. Tanrısevsin had her breakthrough with her role in Güneşi Beklerken, in which she portrayed "Melis Güzel", the sensitive daughter of a famous family who is going through an emotional crises. In 2014, she joined the cast of Kaçak, acting alongside Haluk Bilginer. She continued her career in television with roles in Bana Baba Dedi, Mayıs Kraliçesi and İki Yalancı series. In 2020, she played in the movie Baba Parası, which as of April 2021 is the 68th most-watched movie of all time in Turkey according to Box Office.

Filmography

Films

Television

Awards and nominations

References

External links 
 
 

Living people
1990 births
Turkish television actresses
Turkish film actresses